Always is the second studio album by American recording artist Pebbles. It was released on September 11, 1990, by MCA Records and spawned two Top 20 hits on the U.S. Hot 100, which also hit #1 on the R&B chart: "Giving You the Benefit" (US #4 pop, #1 R&B) and "Love Makes Things Happen" (a duet with Babyface, US #13 pop, #1 R&B), as well as the top-five R&B hit "Backyard" (featuring Salt-N-Pepa), and the top 20 R&B hit "Always".

Track listing

Production 
 Executive producers – L.A. Reid, Babyface, Pebbles
 Producers – L.A. Reid, Babyface, Daryl Simmons, Kayo, Pebbles
 Recorded and engineered by Ron Christopher, Ryan Dorn, Jim Dutt, John Gass, Thom "TK" Kidd, Barney Perkins
 Assistant engineers – Michael Alvord, Steve Battle, Mike Baumgartner, Kyle Bess, Rich Caughron, Jim Champagne, Milton Chan, Ross Donaldson, Fred Law, Ted Malia, Joe Shay, Donnell Sullivan, Michael White, Bill Zalin, Jim "Z" Zumpano
 Mixing – Jon Gass, L.A. Reid
 Mastering – Eddy Shreyer

Personnel 
 Drums – Kayo, L.A. Reid
 Percussion – Kayo, L.A. Reid
 Bass guitar and synth bass – Babyface, Kayo
 Guitars – Babyface
 Keyboards – Babyface, Kayo, Danny Sembello, Daryl Simmons
 Synthesizer programming (Fairlight CMI, Synclavier, Roland) – Donald K. Parks
 Backing vocals – After 7, Babyface, Cherrelle, Johnny Gill, Bambi Jones, Kayo, Pebbles, Daryl Simmons, Karyn White

Charts

Weekly charts

Year-end charts

Certifications

References 

1990 albums
MCA Records albums
Pebbles (singer) albums
Albums produced by L.A. Reid
Albums produced by Babyface (musician)